Zygiella is a genus of orb-weaver spiders first described by F. O. Pickard-Cambridge in 1902. In 2015, Parazygiella was determined to be a taxonomic synonym of Zygiella, and its species were moved to Zygiella.

Identification
Zygiella species are distinguished by the structure of the web, which has a missing sector containing a signaling thread leading to a retreat. Zygiella x-notata, a species in the Zygiella genus, is well-researched for its missing-sector web construction behaviors.

Species
 it contains eleven species:
Zygiella atrica (C. L. Koch, 1845) (type) – Europe. Introduced to USA, Canada
Zygiella calyptrata (Workman & Workman, 1894) – China, Myanmar, Malaysia
Zygiella carpenteri Archer, 1951 – USA
Zygiella dispar (Kulczyński, 1885) – North America, Russia (Far East), Japan
Zygiella hiramatsui Tanikawa, 2017 – Japan
Zygiella keyserlingi (Ausserer, 1871) – Southern Europe, Ukraine, Turkey
Zygiella kirgisica Bakhvalov, 1974 – Kyrgyzstan
Zygiella minima Schmidt, 1968 – Canary Is., Madeira
Zygiella montana (C. L. Koch, 1834) – Europe, Turkey, Caucasus, Russia (Europe to Middle Siberia), Uzbekistan
Zygiella nearctica Gertsch, 1964 – Canada, USA
Zygiella x-notata (Clerck, 1757) – Europe, Turkey, Caucasus, Iran? Introduced to North America, Chile, Uruguay, Argentina, China, Japan, Réunion

References

Araneidae
Araneomorphae genera
Spiders of Asia
Spiders of North America